Eddie Collins was an American Negro league catcher in the 1910s.

Collins made his Negro leagues debut in 1910 with the Brooklyn Royal Giants and New York Black Sox. He went on to play for the Cuban Giants, Pennsylvania Red Caps of New York, and Lincoln Giants through 1918.

References

External links
Baseball statistics and player information from Baseball-Reference Black Baseball Stats and Seamheads

Year of birth missing
Year of death missing
Place of birth missing
Place of death missing
Brooklyn Royal Giants players
Cuban Giants players
Lincoln Giants players
Pennsylvania Red Caps of New York players